Monastir is a comune (municipality) in the Province of South Sardinia in the Italian region of Sardinia, located about  northwest of Cagliari.

Monastir borders the following municipalities: Nuraminis, San Sperate, Serdiana, Sestu, Ussana, Villasor.

Demographic evolution

References

Cities and towns in Sardinia